The Fall School is the oldest public school building remaining in Nashville, Tennessee, U.S.

History 
Built in 1898, it was named after Phillip S. Fall, a Nashville businessman and member of the Board of Education from 1865–1867. The Fall School was notable because it had individual classrooms, unlike the earlier study hall design. It served as an elementary school until 1970, and has been listed on the National Register of Historic Places since December 19, 1979. 

In 1982 a private company renovated it for offices, and today it serves as home of the Nashville Church of Scientology & Celebrity Centre.

References

Buildings and structures on the National Register of Historic Places in Tennessee
School buildings completed in 1898
Buildings and structures in Nashville, Tennessee
1898 establishments in Tennessee